After Glen Campbell's Greatest Hits (1971), The Best of Glen Campbell was the second of official Capitol compilation albums by Glen Campbell and was released in 1976.

Track listing
Side 1:

 "Rhinestone Cowboy" (Larry Weiss) - 3:08
 "Gentle On My Mind" (John Hartford) - 2:56
 "Wichita Lineman"   (Jimmy Webb) - 2:58
 "Galveston"  (Jimmy Webb) - 2:40
 "Houston (I'm Comin' To See You)"  (David Paich) - 3:21
 "Country Boy (You Got Your Feet In L.A.)" (Dennis Lambert, Brian Potter) - 3:05

Side 2:

 "By The Time I Get To Phoenix" (Jimmy Webb) - 2:43
 "The Last Time I Saw Her" (Gordon Lightfoot) - 4:06
 "Try A Little Kindness" (C. Sapaugh, B. Austin) - 2:23
 "It's Only Make Believe" (Conway Twitty, Jack Nance) - 2:18
 "I Knew Jesus (Before He Was A Star)" (N. Hefti, S. Styne) - 2:50
 "The Moon Is a Harsh Mistress" (Jimmy Webb) - 3:04

Production
Producers - Al De Lory, Jimmy Bowen, Dennis Lambert, Brian Potter
Art direction - Roy Kohara
Photography - Kenny Rogers

Charts
Album - Billboard (United States)

1976 greatest hits albums
Glen Campbell compilation albums
Capitol Records compilation albums
Albums produced by Jimmy Bowen